Mean Machine is an all-girl Japanese rock band. Mean Machine starred in the Tower Records "No Music, No Life" advertising campaign, and debuted in 2001.

History
Mean Machine was founded in 1998 by J-pop vocalist Chara, musician/DJ Chiwaki Mayumi, vocalist Yuki of Judy and Mary, saxophonist Yukarie of The Thrill, and actress Ayumi Ito. The group was conceived as a lighthearted side project, and the band members deliberately chose instruments new to them: Yuki and Chara played drums in the band, Mayumi played guitars, Yukarie played bass, and Ayumi was the vocalist.

In 2001, Mean Machine released the single "Suuhaa," named for a kind of breathing exercise Chara learned when she was pregnant. It reached #18 on the Oricon singles chart. Later that year, their debut album Cream was released. The album reached #7 on the Oricon chart and remained on the charts for five weeks. A second single was released later that year, "Knock on You," reaching #38 on the Oricon chart. 

The group was dissolved shortly afterward because of complications with the band members' solo careers.

Members

Discography

Albums

Singles

References

External links
 Ayumi Ito's official website 
 Mayumi Chiwaki's official website 
 Yukarie's official website 
 YUKI's official website 
 Chara's official website 
 No Turning Back | Mean Machine 
 YUKI | Girly Rock 

Japanese rock music groups
All-female bands
Musical groups from Tokyo